The Committee of General Literature and Education was a British publishing organisation set up by the Society for the Promotion of Christian Knowledge in 1832 to produce school books. It also published The Saturday Magazine.

References
 Michael Sanderson, Education, Economic Change and Society in England 1780-1870, Cambridge University Press 1995, 

1832 establishments in the United Kingdom
Christian publishing companies
Church of England missionary societies
Educational book publishing companies
Religious organizations established in 1832